The 108th Regiment of Foot was an infantry regiment of the British Army from 1761 to 1763. It was raised in October 1761 from a cadre of the 31st Regiment of Foot, and was disbanded in 1763.

Regimental colonels
Regimental colonels were:
1761–1762: Lt-Col. Patrick M'Douall
1762: Sir Robert Hamilton, 4th Baronet of Silvertonhill
1762–1763: Maj-Gen. John Scott

References

External links

Infantry regiments of the British Army
Military units and formations established in 1761
Military units and formations disestablished in 1763
1761 establishments in Great Britain